Clinical Case Studies is a bimonthly peer-reviewed medical journal that covers the field of psychotherapy, including  individual, couples, and family therapy. The editor-in-chief is Daniel L. Segal (University of Colorado, Colorado Springs). It was established in 2002 and is published by SAGE Publications.

Abstracting and indexing 
The journal is abstracted and indexed in:
 Current Contents/Social & Behavioral Sciences
 Embase/Excerpta Medica
 Psychological Abstracts/PsycINFO
 Scopus
 Social Sciences Citation Index
According to the Journal Citation Reports, the journal has a 2017 impact factor of 0.742.

References

External links 
 

SAGE Publishing academic journals
English-language journals
Psychotherapy journals
Publications established in 2002
Bimonthly journals
Case report journals